The Filmfare Best Scene of the Year Award is decided by Sony Executives who nominate five scenes of the most popular movies of the year and telecast them on their channel two weeks prior to the event.

The winner is revealed only at the ceremony.

Here is the list of the award winners.

See also
 Filmfare Award
 Bollywood
 Cinema of India

Scene